The women's 500 meter at the 2023 KNSB Dutch Single Distance Championships took place in Heerenveen at the Thialf ice skating rink on Saturday 4 February 2023..
There were 20 participants who raced twice over 500m so that all skaters had to start once in the inner lane and once in the outer lane. Femke Kok, Jutta Leerdam, and Michelle de Jong qualified for the 2023 ISU World Speed Skating Championships in Heerenveen.

Statistics

Result

Draw 1st 500m

Draw 2nd 500m

Referee: Loretta Staring. Assistant: Miriam Kuiper. Starter: Marco Hesselink 

Source:

References

Single Distance Championships
2023 Single Distance
World